Huáncar is a rural municipality and village in the Jujuy Province of Argentina.

References

Populated places in Jujuy Province